North Montgomery Community School Corporation (NMCSC) or North Montgomery Schools is a school district headquartered in unincorporated Montgomery County, Indiana, north of Crawfordsville. The district serves some sections of northern Crawfordsville, Darlington, Linden, New Richmond, Waynetown, and Wingate. It also serves the unincorporated area of Garfield.

Schools
Secondary schools:
 North Montgomery High School
 Northridge Middle School
Primary schools:
 Pleasant Hill Elementary School
 Serves portions of northern Crawfordsville, Linden, New Richmond, and Wingate
 Lester B. Sommer Elementary School
 Serves portions of western Crawfordsville and Waynetown
 Sugar Creek Elementary School
 Serves portions of eastern Crawfordsville and Darlington

See also
School districts in Montgomery County, Indiana:
 Crawfordsville Community School Corporation
 South Montgomery Community School Corporation

References

External links
 North Montgomery School Corporation

Education in Montgomery County, Indiana
School districts in Indiana